Jefferson Transit, badged as The JeT, is a public transportation provider in Jefferson Parish, Louisiana. It serves the most heavily suburbanized areas of New Orleans, providing both local service and commuter access to Downtown New Orleans.

Eastbank Routes
Jefferson Parish Transit operates six Eastbank routes:
E1 Veterans-Airport
E2 Airline Drive
E3 Jefferson Highway
E5 Causeway
E6 Metairie Local
E8 Elmwood

Westbank Routes
Jefferson Parish Transit operates seven Westbank routes:
W1 Avondale
W2 Westbank Expressway
W3 Lapalco
W4 Marrero
W6 Gretna Local
W8 Terrytown
W10 Huey P. Long

On-Demand Zone 
In addition to the fixed-route service, there is also the "Move Metairie On-Demand Zone" that replaced the E4 Metairie Road bus. The on-demand service is provided via Lyft.

Hurricane Evacuation Plan 
Jefferson Parish Transit operates a special "Hurricane Evacuation System" with modified routes when the parish is under evacuation orders due to an impending severe hurricane.

References

Bus transportation in Louisiana
Transit agencies in Louisiana
Transportation in New Orleans
Transportation in Jefferson Parish, Louisiana